Germán Beltrán Juarez (born 26 October 1979) is a Spanish retired footballer who played as a forward, currently a manager.

He spent most of his career in Segunda División B, making 256 appearances and scoring 49 goals for six clubs, mainly Barakaldo. Professionally, he played 36 times in Segunda División for Eibar and Girona, scoring once for each.

Playing career
Born in Alcañiz, Aragon, Beltrán began his career with Real Madrid, playing no higher than the reserves in Segunda División B. In June 2008, after contributing 15 third-division goals for Barakaldo CF, he signed a two-year contract with Segunda División club SD Eibar with a €1.2 million buyout clause.

In Beltrán's first season with the Basques they were relegated, and he only scored in a 2–3 home loss against Real Zaragoza on 25 April 2009. In February 2010, he moved back up to the second tier with Girona FC until the end of the campaign with the option of one more. Again, he scored just once in his spell in Catalonia, minutes after coming on as a substitute for Jordi Xumetra in his second game, a 3–0 away victory over Rayo Vallecano.

Beltrán was back in division three in August 2010, on a one-year deal at Zamora CF. A year later he signed for Tercera División club CD Laudio, and scored the only goal on 29 June 2013 as they overcame Mar Menor FC in the playoff final to reach the third division for the only time in their history.

Coaching career
After retiring at Club Portugalete in 2016, Beltrán subsequently worked as assistant manager at that team. In summer 2018, he was appointed at Barakaldo under Aitor Larrazábal in the same capacity.

Beltrán replaced Larrazábal at the helm of Barakaldo on 28 December 2020. However, after only 43 days and three games (two defeats, one draw), he was himself dismissed on 9 February 2021.

Managerial statistics

References

External links

1979 births
Living people
People from Alcañiz
Sportspeople from the Province of Teruel
Spanish footballers
Footballers from Aragon
Association football forwards
Segunda División players
Segunda División B players
Tercera División players
Real Madrid C footballers
Real Madrid Castilla footballers
CF Reus Deportiu players
CD Teruel footballers
Barakaldo CF footballers
SD Eibar footballers
Girona FC players
Zamora CF footballers
CD Laudio players
Club Portugalete players
Spanish football managers
Segunda División B managers
Tercera Federación managers
Barakaldo CF managers